Cumberland Township may refer to:

 Cumberland Township, Adams County, Pennsylvania, USA
 Cumberland Township, Greene County, Pennsylvania, USA
 Cumberland Township, Ontario, which was incorporated as the City of Cumberland in 1999

See also 
Cumberland (disambiguation)

Township name disambiguation pages